DLT, the International Conference on Developments in Language Theory is an academic conference in the field 
of computer science
held annually under the auspices of the European Association for Theoretical Computer Science. Like most theoretical computer science conferences its contributions are strongly peer-reviewed; the articles appear in proceedings published in Springer Lecture Notes in Computer Science. Extended versions of selected papers of each year's conference appear in international journals, such as Theoretical Computer Science and International Journal of Foundations of Computer Science.

Topics of the conference 
Typical topics include:

 grammars, acceptors and transducers for words, trees and graphs
 algebraic theories of automata
 algorithmic, combinatorial and algebraic properties of words and languages
 variable length codes
 symbolic dynamics
 cellular automata
 polyominoes and multidimensional patterns
  decidability questions
  image manipulation and compression
  efficient text algorithms
  relationships between formal language theory and cryptography, concurrency, complexity theory and logic
  bio-inspired computing and quantum computing

History of the Conference 
The DLT conference series was established by Grzegorz Rozenberg and Arto Salomaa in 1993. Since 2010, the Steering Committee chairman is Juhani Karhumäki.

 23rd DLT 2019 in Warsaw, Poland
 22nd DLT 2018 in Tokyo, Japan
 21st DLT 2017 in Liège, Belgium
 20th DLT 2016 in Montreal, Canada
 19th DLT 2015 in Liverpool, England
 18th DLT 2014 in Ekaterinburg, Russia
 17th DLT 2013 in Marne-la-Vallée, France
 16th DLT 2012 in Taipei, Taiwan
 15th DLT 2011 in Milan, Italy
Special Issue: International Journal of Foundations of Computer Science 23(5), August 2012
 14th DLT 2010 in London (Ontario), Canada
Special Issue: International Journal of Foundations of Computer Science 22(7), November 2011
 13th DLT 2009 in Stuttgart, Germany
Special Issue: International Journal of Foundations of Computer Science 22(2), February 2011
 12th DLT 2008 in Kyoto, Japan
Special Issue: International Journal of Foundations of Computer Science 21(4), August 2010
 11th DLT 2007 in Turku, Finland
Special Issue: International Journal of Foundations of Computer Science 19(3), June 2008
 10th DLT 2006 in Santa Barbara, CA, USA
Special Issue: Theoretical Computer Science 376(1-2), May 2007
 9th DLT 2005  in Palermo, Italy
Special Issue: International Journal of Foundations of Computer Science 17(3), June 2006
 8th DLT 2004 in Auckland, New Zealand
Special Issue: International Journal of Foundations of Computer Science 16(4), August 2005
 7th DLT 2003 in Szeged, Hungary
Special Issue: Theoretical Computer Science, 327(3), 2004
 6th DLT 2002 in Kyoto, Japan
 5th DLT 2001 in Vienna, Austria
 4th DLT 1999 in Aachen, Germany
 3rd DLT 1997 in Thessaloniki, Greece
 2nd DLT 1995 in Magdeburg, Germany
 1st DLT 1993 in Turku, Finland

See also 
List of computer science conferences contains other academic conferences in computer science
Formal languages are the main subject of this conference

References 
 M. Kudlek. "Report on DLT 2004". Bulletin of the EATCS 85:207-215, February 2005. (available for download)
 M. Daley. "Report on DLT 2006". Bulletin of the EATCS 90:227-229, October 2006. (available for download)
 M. Kudlek. "Report on DLT 2008". Bulletin of the EATCS 97:171-174, February 2009.
 M. Kudlek. "Report on DLT 2009". Bulletin of the EATCS 100:155-159, February 2010.
 M. Kudlek. "Report on DLT 2010". Bulletin of the EATCS 102:227-232, October 2010. (available for download)

External links
 
 DLT proceedings information from DBLP

Theoretical computer science conferences
Formal languages